The 2015 Canadian federal election held on October 19, 2015, saw the Liberal Party, led by Justin Trudeau, win 184 seats, allowing it to form a majority government with Trudeau becoming the next prime minister.

The election was held to elect members to the House of Commons of the 42nd Canadian Parliament. In keeping with the maximum four year term under a 2007 amendment to the Canada Elections Act, the writs of election for the 2015 election were issued by Governor General David Johnston on August 4. The ensuing campaign was one of the longest in Canadian history. It was also the first time since the 1979 election that a prime minister attempted to remain in office into a fourth consecutive Parliament and the first time since the 1980 election that someone attempted to win a fourth term of any kind as prime minister.

The Liberal Party, led by Justin Trudeau, won 184 seats, allowing it to form a majority government with Trudeau becoming the next prime minister. Trudeau and the rest of his cabinet were sworn in on November 4, 2015. The Conservative Party, led by incumbent Prime Minister Stephen Harper, won 99 seats, becoming the Official Opposition after nearly a decade on the government benches. The New Democratic Party, led by Tom Mulcair, won 44 seats, becoming the third-largest party in the House of Commons, after having formed the Official Opposition following the 2011 election. The Bloc Québécois won 10 seats, the Green Party won 1 seat, and Strength in Democracy lost all its seats.

The Liberal Party's increase of 148 seats from the previous election was the largest-ever numerical increase by a party in a Canadian election. Prior to the campaign, the Liberals had held only 36 seats—the fewest seats ever held at dissolution by any federal party that won the following election. The Liberals also became the first federal party in Canadian history to win a majority of seats without having been either the governing party or the Official Opposition in the previous parliament, and this was only the second time a party went from having the third-most seats to the most seats (the first being in 1925). It was the second largest number of seats won in a federal election for the Liberals, the best being 191 in 1949. The election also had the highest voter turnout since 1993. Every party represented in the House of Commons except the Liberal Party recorded a decrease in its popular vote share.

Following the election, Harper conceded defeat to Trudeau and resigned as leader of the Conservative Party. Gilles Duceppe resigned as leader of the Bloc Québécois shortly after the election on October 22, 2015. Tom Mulcair announced his intention to remain leader of the NDP, but was forced to step down in October 2017, after losing a party vote on his leadership in the spring of 2016.

Background

The 2011 federal election resulted in the continuation of the incumbent Conservative government headed by Stephen Harper, while the New Democratic Party (NDP) became Official Opposition and the Liberal Party became the third party. The Bloc Québécois won four seats and the Green Party won one seat. Liberal leader Michael Ignatieff and Bloc leader Gilles Duceppe resigned shortly after failing to win their own ridings. The Bloc Québécois lost official party status by failing to attain the minimum seats needed (12).

Bob Rae was chosen as interim leader of the Liberal Party. In July 2011 Jack Layton, suffering from cancer, temporarily stepped down as leader of the NDP because of illness, indicating his intention to return for the reconvening of Parliament in September.  Weeks later Layton died of cancer and was given a state funeral. In March 2012 Tom Mulcair was elected leader of the New Democratic Party. In April 2013 Justin Trudeau was elected leader of the Liberal Party. Bloc Québécois leader Daniel Paillé stepped down in December 2013 and was eventually replaced in June 2014 by Mario Beaulieu, who in turn was later replaced in June 2015 by Duceppe. In late 2014, MPs Jean-François Larose of the NDP and Jean-François Fortin of the Bloc formed the new political party Strength in Democracy.

As set forth in the Fair Representation Act, the number of seats in the House of Commons to be contested in the 42nd Canadian federal election was 338, an increase of 30 seats from the 308 seats comprising the House of Commons of Canada of the 41st Parliament of Canada, at its dissolution.

Prime Minister Stephen Harper requested writs of election for a federal general election from Governor General David Johnston on August 2.  The official proclamations were issued on August 4. The date of the vote is determined by the fixed-date Canada Elections Act. At 11 weeks, the campaign was the longest in modern Canadian history.

As a result of the 2012 federal electoral redistribution, the number of electoral districts was increased to 338, with additional seats based on population assigned to Alberta (6), British Columbia (6), Ontario (15), and Quebec (3).

Campaign slogans

Election campaign

Leaders' debates 

Traditionally, party leaders participated in at least two nationally televised debates during the federal election – at least one each in English and French.  These debates were produced by a consortium of Canada's major television networks. In May 2015, the Conservatives said they would not participate in the consortium debates and instead would take part in as many as five independently staged debates in the run-up to the fall federal election. Ultimately, the Conservatives agreed to participate in a French-language debate organized by the consortium of broadcasters as one of their five debates.  The New Democratic Party confirmed that Tom Mulcair would accept every debate where the prime minister was present. The NDP had previously confirmed its intention to participate in both of the consortium debates before Stephen Harper withdrew but ultimately only participated in the French language consortium debate which included the Conservatives. Liberal leader Justin Trudeau attended the Maclean's, Globe and Mail, and French consortium debates; and the Liberals confirmed he would attend the other debates. The Bloc Québécois attended the French language consortium debate and confirmed its attendance at the French-language TVA debate. The Green Party attended the Maclean's and French language consortium debates, and confirmed its intention to participate in the English language consortium debate.  Strength in Democracy, which had the same number of seats in the House of Commons at dissolution as the Greens and Bloc Québécois, were not invited to participate in any of the televised debates. The leaders of the party objected to their exclusion and launched a petition demanding that all parties represented in Parliament be invited to the debates. Other minor parties without representation in the House of Commons were not invited to participate in any of the televised debates.

Controversies 
The second Canadian federal election to significantly incorporate social media, the 2015 campaign was notable for the rise of new avenues of scrutiny for potential candidates. A number of damaging revelations for each of the major political parties late in the campaign led to calls for increased vetting amongst political strategists, academics and outside observers.

Opinion polls 

Evolution of voting intentions during the campaign leading up to the 2015 Canadian federal election to be held on October 19, 2015. Points represent results of individual polls.

Endorsements

Election spending 
Before the campaign, there were no limits to what a political party, candidate, or third party (corporations, unions, special interest groups, etc.) can spend: spending rules are only in force after the writs have been dropped and the campaign has begun. Because the election period is set longer than the standard 37-day election period, spending limits are increased in proportion to the length of the period.

Reimbursements for political parties and candidates 

Political parties receive a reimbursement for 50 per cent of their election expenses during the writ period.  Similarly, candidates (through their official agents) receive a reimbursement of 60 per cent of their election expenses during the writ period.  Both reimbursements are publicly funded.

Fundraising 

Elections Canada reports that during the financial quarter preceding the writ period, the Conservatives received $7.4 million in contributions, the NDP received $4.5 million, and the Liberals received $4.0 million. The NDP had the most individual donors at 48,314, followed by the Conservatives at 45,532 and then the Liberals at 32,789.

The New Democratic Party stated that it collected greater than $9 million in the third quarter of 2015, the most it ever received from donors, and greater than the quarterly record established by the Conservative Party in 2011.

At the riding level, financial reports in each of the 338 constituencies showed that in Conservative electoral district associations ended 2014 with net assets totalling more than $19 million, Liberal riding associations reported a total of about $8 million in net assets, and NDP associations more than $4.4 million.

Individuals are able to give up to $1,500 to each political party and an additional $1,500 to all the registered associations, nomination contestants and candidates of each registered party combined.

Registered third parties 

A person or group must register as a third party immediately after incurring election advertising expenses totalling $500 or more.  There are strict limits on advertising expenses, and specific limits that can be incurred to promote or oppose the election of one or more candidates in a particular electoral district.  There were 112 registered third parties in the 2015 election. There was a $150,000 election advertising expenses limit.  Of that amount, no more than $8,788 could be incurred to promote or oppose the election of one or more candidates in a particular electoral district.

Results 

|- style="text-align:center;background-color:#e9e9e9"
! rowspan="2" colspan="2" style="text-align:left;" | Party
! rowspan="2" style="text-align:left;" | Party leader
! rowspan="2" | Candidates
! colspan="6" | Seats
! colspan="5" | Popular vote
|- style="text-align:center;background-color:#e9e9e9"
| 2011
| style="font-size:80%" | Dissol.
| style="font-size:80%" |Redist.
| 2015
| style="font-size:80%" | % changefrom 2011
| style="font-size:80%" | % seats
| style="font-size:80%" | Votes
| style="font-size:80%" | Votechange
| style="font-size:80%" |%
| style="font-size:80%" | pp change
| style="font-size:80%" | % whererunning
|-

| style="text-align:left;" |Justin Trudeau
| style="text-align:right;" |338
| style="text-align:right;" |34
| style="text-align:right;" |36
| style="text-align:right;" |36
| style="text-align:right;" |184
| style="text-align:right;" |+%
| style="text-align:right;" |%
| style="text-align:right;" |6,942,937
| style="text-align:right;" |+4,159,861
| style="text-align:right;" |39.47%
| style="text-align:right;" |+20.57pp
| style="text-align:right;" |39.47%

| style="text-align:left;" |Stephen Harper
| style="text-align:right;" |338
| style="text-align:right;" |166
| style="text-align:right;" |159
| style="text-align:right;" |188
| style="text-align:right;" |99
| style="text-align:right;" |%
| style="text-align:right;" |%
| style="text-align:right;" |5,613,633
| style="text-align:right;" |−221,637
| style="text-align:right;" |31.91%
| style="text-align:right;" |−7.72pp
| style="text-align:right;" |31.91%

| style="text-align:left;" |Tom Mulcair
| style="text-align:right;" |338
| style="text-align:right;" |103
| style="text-align:right;" |95
| style="text-align:right;" |109
| style="text-align:right;" |44
| style="text-align:right;" |%
| style="text-align:right;" |%
| style="text-align:right;" |3,469,368
| style="text-align:right;" |−1,043,043
| style="text-align:right;" |19.72%
| style="text-align:right;" |−10.92pp
| style="text-align:right;" |19.73%

| style="text-align:left;" |Gilles Duceppe
| style="text-align:right;" |78
| style="text-align:right;" |4
| style="text-align:right;" |2
| style="text-align:right;" |4
| style="text-align:right;" |10
| style="text-align:right;" |+%
| style="text-align:right;" |%
| style="text-align:right;" |821,144
| style="text-align:right;" |−70,281
| style="text-align:right;" |4.67%
| style="text-align:right;" |−1.39pp
| style="text-align:right;" |19.36%

| style="text-align:left;" |Elizabeth May
| style="text-align:right;" |336
| style="text-align:right;" |1
| style="text-align:right;" |2
| style="text-align:right;" |1
| style="text-align:right;" |1
| style="text-align:right;" |%
| style="text-align:right;" |%
| style="text-align:right;" |602,933
| style="text-align:right;" |+30,838 
| style="text-align:right;" |3.43%
| style="text-align:right;" |−0.46pp
| style="text-align:right;" |3.44%

| style="text-align:left;" colspan="2" |Independent and No Affiliation
| style="text-align:right;" |80
| style="text-align:right;" |0
| style="text-align:right;" |8
| style="text-align:right;" |0
| style="text-align:right;" |0
| style="text-align:right;" |0
| style="text-align:right;" |0
| style="text-align:right;" |49,616
| style="text-align:right;" |−23,245
| style="text-align:right;" |0.28%
| style="text-align:right;" |−0.21pp
| style="text-align:right;" |1.18%

| style="text-align:left;" |Tim Moen
| style="text-align:right;" |72
| style="text-align:right;" |0
| style="text-align:right;" |0
| style="text-align:right;" |0
| style="text-align:right;" |0
| style="text-align:right;" |0
| style="text-align:right;" |0
| style="text-align:right;" |36,775
| style="text-align:right;" |+30,773
| style="text-align:right;" |0.21%
| style="text-align:right;" |+0.17pp
| style="text-align:right;" |0.93%

| style="text-align:left;" |Rod Taylor
| style="text-align:right;" |30
| style="text-align:right;" |0
| style="text-align:right;" |0
| style="text-align:right;" |0
| style="text-align:right;" |0
| style="text-align:right;" |0
| style="text-align:right;" |0
| style="text-align:right;" |15,232
| style="text-align:right;" |−3,678
| style="text-align:right;" |0.09%
| style="text-align:right;" |−0.04pp
| style="text-align:right;" |0.97%

| style="text-align:left;" |Anna Di Carlo
| style="text-align:right;" |70
| style="text-align:right;" |0
| style="text-align:right;" |0
| style="text-align:right;" |0
| style="text-align:right;" |0
| style="text-align:right;" |0
| style="text-align:right;" |0
| style="text-align:right;" |8,838
| style="text-align:right;" |−1,087
| style="text-align:right;" |0.05%
| style="text-align:right;" |−0.02pp
| style="text-align:right;" |0.23%

| style="text-align:left;" |
| style="text-align:right;" |17
| 
| style="text-align:right;" |2
| 
| style="text-align:right;" |0
| style="text-align:right;" |0
| style="text-align:right;" |0
| style="text-align:right;" |8,274
| style="text-align:right;" |*
| style="text-align:right;" |0.05%
| style="text-align:right;" |*
| style="text-align:right;" |0.90%

| style="text-align:left;" |Sébastien Corriveau
| style="text-align:right;" |27
| style="text-align:right;" |0
| style="text-align:right;" |0
| style="text-align:right;" |0
| style="text-align:right;" |0
| style="text-align:right;" |0
| style="text-align:right;" |0
| style="text-align:right;" |7,263
| style="text-align:right;" |+3,463
| style="text-align:right;" |0.04%
| style="text-align:right;" |+0.02pp
| style="text-align:right;" |0.52%

| style="text-align:left;" |Sinclair Stevens
| style="text-align:right;" |8
| style="text-align:right;" |0
| style="text-align:right;" |0
| style="text-align:right;" |0
| style="text-align:right;" |0
| style="text-align:right;" |0
| style="text-align:right;" |0
| style="text-align:right;" |4,476
| style="text-align:right;" |−1,314
| style="text-align:right;" |0.03%
| style="text-align:right;" |−0.01pp
| style="text-align:right;" |1.03%

| style="text-align:left;" |Miguel Figueroa
| style="text-align:right;" |26
| style="text-align:right;" |0
| style="text-align:right;" |0
| style="text-align:right;" |0
| style="text-align:right;" |0
| style="text-align:right;" |0
| style="text-align:right;" |0
| style="text-align:right;" |4,393
| style="text-align:right;" |+1,499
| style="text-align:right;" |0.02%
| style="text-align:right;" |+0.01pp
| style="text-align:right;" |0.32%

| style="text-align:left;" |Liz White
| style="text-align:right;" |8
| style="text-align:right;" |0
| style="text-align:right;" |0
| style="text-align:right;" |0
| style="text-align:right;" |0
| style="text-align:right;" |0
| style="text-align:right;" |0
| style="text-align:right;" |1,699
| style="text-align:right;" |+355
| style="text-align:right;" |0.01%
| style="text-align:right;" |–
| style="text-align:right;" |0.36%

| style="text-align:left;" |Blair Longley
| style="text-align:right;" |8
| style="text-align:right;" |0
| style="text-align:right;" |0
| style="text-align:right;" |0
| style="text-align:right;" |0
| style="text-align:right;" |0
| style="text-align:right;" |0
| style="text-align:right;" |1,557
| style="text-align:right;" |−199
| style="text-align:right;" |0.01%
| style="text-align:right;" |–
| style="text-align:right;" |0.34%

| style="text-align:left;" |Stephen Garvey
| style="text-align:right;" |4
| 
| style="text-align:right;" |0
| 
| style="text-align:right;" |0
| style="text-align:right;" |0
| style="text-align:right;" |0
| style="text-align:right;" |1,187
| style="text-align:right;" |*
| style="text-align:right;" |0.01%
| style="text-align:right;" |*
| style="text-align:right;" |0.62%

| style="text-align:left;" |Roderick Lim
| style="text-align:right;" |5
| style="text-align:right;" |0
| style="text-align:right;" |0
| style="text-align:right;" |0
| style="text-align:right;" |0
| style="text-align:right;" |0
| style="text-align:right;" |0
| style="text-align:right;" |908
| style="text-align:right;" |−2,289
| style="text-align:right;" |0.01%
| style="text-align:right;" |−0.02pp
| style="text-align:right;" |0.32%

| style="text-align:left;" |Jeremy Arney
| style="text-align:right;" |3
| style="text-align:right;" |0
| style="text-align:right;" |0
| style="text-align:right;" |0
| style="text-align:right;" |0
| style="text-align:right;" |0
| style="text-align:right;" |0
| style="text-align:right;" |401
| style="text-align:right;" |−1,550
| style="text-align:right;" |0.00%
| style="text-align:right;" |−0.01pp
| style="text-align:right;" |0.24%

| style="text-align:left;" |Jim Pankiw
| style="text-align:right;" |1
| 
| style="text-align:right;" |0
| 
| style="text-align:right;" |0
| style="text-align:right;" |0
| style="text-align:right;" |0
| style="text-align:right;" |271
| style="text-align:right;" |*
| style="text-align:right;" |0.00%
| style="text-align:right;" |*
| style="text-align:right;" |0.72%

| style="text-align:left;" |Daniel J. Patton
| style="text-align:right;" |1
| 
| 
| 
| style="text-align:right;" |0
| style="text-align:right;" |0
| style="text-align:right;" |0
| style="text-align:right;" |157
| style="text-align:right;" |*
| style="text-align:right;" |0.00%
| style="text-align:right;" |*
| style="text-align:right;" |0.29%

| style="text-align:left;" |François Bélanger
| style="text-align:right;" |1
| 
| 
| 
| style="text-align:right;" |0
| style="text-align:right;" |0
| style="text-align:right;" |0
| style="text-align:right;" |136
| style="text-align:right;" |*
| style="text-align:right;" |0.00%
| style="text-align:right;" |*
| style="text-align:right;" |0.22%

| style="text-align:left;" |David Berlin
| style="text-align:right;" |1
| 
| style="text-align:right;" |0
| 
| style="text-align:right;" |0
| style="text-align:right;" |0
| style="text-align:right;" |0
| style="text-align:right;" |122
| style="text-align:right;" |*
| style="text-align:right;" |0.00%
| style="text-align:right;" |*
| style="text-align:right;" |0.29%

| style="text-align:left;" |Michael Nicula
| style="text-align:right;" |1
| 
| style="text-align:right;" |0
| 
| style="text-align:right;" |0
| style="text-align:right;" |0
| style="text-align:right;" |0
| style="text-align:right;" |91
| style="text-align:right;" |*
| style="text-align:right;" |0.00%
| style="text-align:right;" |*
| style="text-align:right;" |0.17%

| style="text-align:left;" |Bob Kesic
| style="text-align:right;" |1
| style="text-align:right;" |0
| style="text-align:right;" |0
| style="text-align:right;" |0
| style="text-align:right;" |0
| style="text-align:right;" |0
| style="text-align:right;" |0
| style="text-align:right;" |57
| style="text-align:right;" |−237
| style="text-align:right;" |0.00%
| style="text-align:right;" |−0.00pp
| style="text-align:right;" |0.10%
|-
| colspan="3" style="text-align:left;" |Vacant
| style="text-align:right;" |0
| style="text-align:right;" |4
| style="text-align:right;" |0
| style="text-align:right;" |0
|colspan="7" 
|-
| colspan="3" style="text-align:left;" |Total
| style="text-align:right;" |1,792
| style="text-align:right;" |308
| style="text-align:right;" |308
| style="text-align:right;" |338
| style="text-align:right;" |338
| style="text-align:right;" |+%
| style="text-align:right;" |%
| style="text-align:center;" |17,591,468
| style="text-align:center;" |+2,870,888
| style="text-align:center;" |100%
| style="text-align:center;" |
| style="text-align:center;" |100%
|-
| style="text-align:left;" colspan="15" | Source: Elections Canada (Final results)

Results by province

Election aftermath 

Hours after conceding defeat on election night, incumbent Prime Minister Stephen Harper resigned as leader of the Conservative Party, though he announced his intention to remain in the new parliament as a backbencher after being elected in the riding of Calgary Heritage. The Conservative caucus met on November 5, 2015, and elected former health minister and Alberta MP Rona Ambrose as interim leader of the party, and hence, interim Leader of the Official Opposition. The next Conservative Party of Canada leadership election was held on May 27, 2017. Following his swearing in on November 4, 2015, Prime Minister Justin Trudeau announced that parliament would reconvene on December 3, 2015, with the Speech from the Throne to follow on December 4.

Commentary 
In the aftermath of the 2011 election, many pundits had characterized it as a realigning election. Lawrence Martin, commentator for The Globe and Mail said, "Harper has completed a remarkable reconstruction of a Canadian political landscape that endured for more than a century. The realignment saw both old parties of the moderate middle, the Progressive Conservatives and the Liberals, either eliminated or marginalized." Andrew Coyne, writing in Maclean's, said the election marked "an unprecedented realignment of Canadian politics" as "the Conservatives are now in a position to replace the Liberals as the natural governing party in Canada."

Despite the grim outlook and poor early poll numbers, when the 2015 election was held, the Liberals under Trudeau made an unprecedented comeback. Gaining 148 seats, they won a majority government for the first time since 2000. Chantal Hébert, writing in the Toronto Star, claimed the comeback was "headed straight for the history books" and that Harper's name would "forever be joined with that of his Liberal nemesis in Canada's electoral annals". Spencer McKay, writing for the National Post, suggested that "maybe we've witnessed a revival of Canada's 'natural governing party'".

International reactions
 : Foreign Ministry Deputy Director and Spokeswoman Hua Chunying expressed hope on building on existing relations between Canada and China, stating "a sustainable and steady development of China–Canada relations" will benefit both countries.
 : German Ambassador to Canada Werner Wnendt said that his government welcomed Trudeau's commitment to restoring a multilateral foreign policy and "the traditional voice that Canada has had at the UN has been missed".
 : Prime Minister Narendra Modi congratulated Trudeau by telephone where he reminisced about meeting Trudeau's family, expressed hope for further improvement of Canada–India relations, and invited Trudeau to visit India.
 : Prime Minister Matteo Renzi sent Trudeau a Twitter message wishing him luck and saying that he looked forward to them meeting at the 2015 G-20 Antalya summit.
 : President Enrique Peña Nieto congratulated Trudeau by telephone and tweeted that "Canada and Mexico have the opportunity to start a new chapter in their relationship".
 : President Barack Obama congratulated Trudeau on the result in a telephone call where the two discussed Canada–United States relations, the Trans-Pacific Partnership, and the 2015 climate change conference in Paris.

Cabinet appointments 

On November 4, 2015, the following individuals were sworn in as cabinet ministers of the 29th Canadian Ministry, in addition to Justin Trudeau as prime minister and minister of Intergovernmental Affairs and Youth:

See also 

Fixed election dates in Canada
List of Canadian federal general elections
List of political parties in Canada
Results by riding of the Canadian federal election, 2015
2011 Bloc Québécois leadership election
2012 New Democratic Party leadership election
2013 Liberal Party of Canada leadership election
2014 Bloc Québécois leadership election

Notes

References

Further reading

External links 
Elections Canada

 
Justin Trudeau